Frank G. Cousins, Jr. (born May 7, 1958, in Boston, Massachusetts) is an American politician who served as the Essex County, Massachusetts Sheriff. Cousins became the first African-American sheriff in Massachusetts when he was appointed to the position in 1996 by then Massachusetts Governor William Weld.

Prior to his appointment to sheriff, Cousins had served on the Newburyport, Massachusetts City Council, and then in the Massachusetts House of Representatives from 1993 up until he became sheriff. As a Republican, Cousins has won elections for the sheriff position in 1998, 2004, and 2010 in heavily Democratic Essex County. He did not run for reelection in 2016.

References

1958 births
Living people
Politicians from Newburyport, Massachusetts
African-American sheriffs
African-American state legislators in Massachusetts
Massachusetts city council members
Republican Party members of the Massachusetts House of Representatives
Sheriffs of Essex County, Massachusetts
Massachusetts local politicians
21st-century African-American people
20th-century African-American people